The Blasenflue is a mountain of the Bernese Alps, located near Signau in the canton of Bern.

References

External links
Blasenflue on Hikr

Mountains of the Alps
Mountains of Switzerland
Mountains of the canton of Bern
One-thousanders of Switzerland